Fetuin-B is a protein that in humans is encoded by the FETUB gene.

The protein encoded by this gene is a member of the fetuin family, part of the cystatin superfamily of cysteine protease inhibitors. Fetuins have been implicated in several diverse functions, including osteogenesis and bone resorption, regulation of the insulin and hepatocyte growth factor receptors, and response to systemic inflammation. This protein may be secreted by cells.

See also
Fetuin-A (alpha-2-HS-glycoprotein)

References

Further reading